Gosaba Assembly constituency is a Legislative Assembly constituency of South 24 Parganas district in the Indian State of West Bengal. It is reserved for Scheduled Castes.

Overview
As per order of the Delimitation Commission in respect of the Delimitation of constituencies in the West Bengal, Gosaba Assembly constituency is composed of the following:
 Gosaba community development block
 Masjidbati and Chunakhali gram panchayats of Basanti community development block

Gosaba Assembly constituency is a part of No. 19 Jaynagar (Lok Sabha constituency).

Members of Legislative Assembly

Election Results

2021 By election

Legislative Assembly Election 2021

Legislative Assembly Election 2016

Legislative Assembly Election 2011

Legislative Assembly Elections 1977-2006
In 2006, Chittaranjan Mondal of RSP won the Gosaba Assembly constituency defeating his nearest rival Jayanta Naskar of AITC. Ganesh Chandra Mondal of RSP won from 1977 to 2001, defeating Sujit Pramanick of AITC in 2001 and 1996, Jitendranath Gayen of INC in 1991, Pramila Biswas of INC in 1987, Sandhyakar Mondal of INC in 1982 and Paresh Chandra Baidya of INC in 1977.

Legislative Assembly Elections 1967-1972
Paresh Chandra Baidya of INC won in 1972. Ganesh Chandra Mondal of RSP won in 1971 and 1969. G.N.Mondal of BJS won in 1967. The seat did not exist prior to that.

References

Notes

Citations

Assembly constituencies of West Bengal
Politics of South 24 Parganas district